The 1950 Chicago Cardinals season was the 31st season the team was in the league. The team failed to improve on their previous output of 6–5–1, winning only five games. They failed to qualify for the playoffs for the second consecutive season.

Schedule

Standings

References

1950
Chicago Cardinals
Chicago Card